WASP-LP is a campus variety-formatted broadcast radio station licensed to Huntington, West Virginia, and serving Huntington and Kenova in West Virginia and Burlington, Ohio.  WASP-LP is owned and operated by Wayne County Board of Education.

Programming includes The Weekend Throwdown with Jagger, Remix Top30 with Hollywood Hamilton, and M.G. Kelly's Amazing 80s

References

External links
 

2016 establishments in West Virginia
Variety radio stations in the United States
High school radio stations in the United States
Radio stations established in 2016
ASP-LP
ASP-LP